Grensted may be:

 Rev. Laurence Grensted (1884–1964), British Anglican priest and theologian
 The name of West Grinstead in the Domesday Survey

See also
 Grinstead (disambiguation)